Geetanjali Kulkarni is an Indian actress who works in Marathi Cinema and in Hindi cinema. She has received three Filmfare Awards.

Accolades

Filmography
2004 - Aga Bai Arrecha!
2014 - Ragini MMS 2
2014 - Court
2015 - P Se PM Tak
2016 - Hotel Salvation
2018 - Selection Day (TV series)
2019 - Photograph
2019 - Anandi Gopal
2019 - Bombay Rose
2019 – Present - Gullak (TV series) as Shanti Mishra
2020 - Vegali Vaat
2020 - Taj Mahal 1989 (TV series) as Sarita Baig
2020 - Operation MBBS (TV series)
2021 - Karkhanisanchi Waari
2021 - Present - Aarya (TV series) as Sushila Shekhar
2022 - Unpaused: Naya Safar (Anthology Series)
2022 - Humble Politician Nograj as Ms. Dalal
2022 - Cobalt Blue as Sharada Dixit
2022 - Minimum
 2022 –  Rangbaaz Darr Ki Rajneeti

References

External links
 

Indian actresses
Living people
Year of birth missing (living people)